Dadi was a Sultan of Kano who reigned from 1670-1703.

Biography in the Kano Chronicle
Below is a biography of Dadi from Palmer's 1908 English translation of the Kano Chronicle.

References

Monarchs of Kano